Bradwell v. State of Illinois, 83 U.S. (16 Wall.) 130 (1873), was a United States Supreme Court case that solidified the narrow reading of the Privileges or Immunities Clause of the Fourteenth Amendment, and determined that the right to practice a profession was not among these privileges. Brought by Myra Bradwell, the case is also notable for being an early 14th Amendment challenge to sex discrimination in the United States.

Background of the case
In 1869, Myra Bradwell passed the Illinois bar exam and applied for admission to the Illinois bar in accordance with a state statute that permitted any adult of good character and with sufficient training to be admitted to the practice of law. Because she was a woman, however, the Illinois Supreme Court denied her admission, noting that the "strife" of the bar would surely destroy femininity. The legal rationale was based on the common law doctrine of coverture which denied a married woman a legal existence apart from her husband. Bradwell appealed the decision to the United States Supreme Court, arguing that her right to practice law was protected by the Privileges or Immunities clause of the Fourteenth Amendment.

Decision

Majority opinion
The Supreme Court disagreed with Bradwell in an 8–1 ruling. It upheld the decision of the Illinois court and ruled that the Privileges or Immunities Clause of the Fourteenth Amendment did not include the right to practice a profession. Therefore, it was properly regulable by the states. The majority opinion avoided lengthy discussion of that point by referring to the discussion of privileges and immunities in the Slaughterhouse Cases.

The majority also dismissed any claim under the privileges and immunities clause of the original Constitution in Article IV, Section 2, Clause 1. Bradwell argued that because she had been born in Vermont but later moved to Illinois, the latter state's denial of a law license was interstate discrimination. However, the Court noted that under the recently-enacted Fourteenth Amendment, "All persons born or naturalized in the United States, and subject to the jurisdiction thereof, are citizens of the United States and of the State wherein they reside." Because Bradwell had been a resident of Illinois for several years, she was now a citizen of that state and that the interstate provision of Article IV therefore did not apply. 

The court's reasoning also partly hinged on the determination that an attorney was an "officer of the court." The court - fearing that if they allowed women to become lawyers, they would thereby allow women to hold any civil office - was not prepared to hold that women could be lawyers.

Other opinions
Although the majority opinion made virtually no reference to Bradwell's sex and did not decide the case on the basis of her being a woman, three justices found that  fact to be critical. Justice Bradley's opinion concurring in the Court's judgment claimed, "The natural and proper timidity and delicacy which belongs to the female sex evidently unfits it for many of the occupations of civil life.... The paramount destiny and mission of women are to fulfill the noble and benign offices of wife and mother. This is the law of the Creator" (83 U. S. 130, 142). That was at odds with Bradley's dissent in the Slaughterhouse Cases in which he had argued, with respect to men, that "the right of any citizen to follow whatever lawful employment he chooses to adopt (submitting himself to all lawful regulations) is one of his most valuable rights, and one which the legislature of a State cannot invade, whether restrained by its own constitution or not" (83 U.S. 36, 114).

The sole dissenter, Chief Justice Chase, was unable to file an opinion because of deteriorating health.

Aftermath
Because the Supreme Court limited the application of the Privileges and Immunities Clause of the Constitution to the privileges of noncitizens in foreign United States states and massively limited the Privileges or Immunities Clause of the Fourteenth Amendment in the Slaughterhouse Cases, parties alleging discrimination later turned to the Equal Protection Clause.

In 1971, the Supreme Court would for the first time use the Equal Protection Clause to overturn a gender-based distinction in Reed v. Reed. It then applied only a rational basis review to strike down a decision giving males preference to females to administer estates. The Court later applied intermediate scrutiny in Craig v. Boren, an approach that is still applied.

The same year that the opinion in this case was handed down, Bradwell was also denied appointment as notary public by the governor of Illinois. Bradwell's case in part prompted the Illinois Legislature to adopt a statute in 1872 forbidding sex discrimination in professional licensing. Toward the end of her life, the Illinois Supreme Court and the U.S. Supreme Court admitted Bradwell to practice law nunc pro tunc, and the year of her admittance was officially, albeit symbolically, 1869.

See also
List of United States Supreme Court cases, volume 83

Notes

References

Further reading
 Cullen-DuPont, Kathryn. Encyclopedia of Women's History in America (Infobase Publishing, 2009) pp 32–34

External links

 

United States Supreme Court cases
United States Supreme Court cases of the Chase Court
United States equal protection case law
Privileges or Immunities case law
1873 in United States case law
Legal history of Illinois
United States gender discrimination case law